Derak (also Romanized as Derāk and Dārak) is a village in Shahi Rural District, Sardasht District, dezful County, Khuzestan Province, Iran. At the 2006 census, its population was 128, in 18 families.

References 

Populated places in Andimeshk County